Lidth's jay (Garrulus lidthi) or the Amami jay, is a passerine bird in the family Corvidae, native to Japan.

It has no discernible crest, with the head feathers a velvety black, the shoulders and back a deep purplish blue and all other parts a rich chestnut purple.

This jay has a very restricted distribution occurring only on the southern Japanese islands of Amami Ōshima and Tokunoshima in pine forest, sub-tropical woodland and cultivated areas especially around villages.

Food is largely made up of the nuts of the native chinkapin Castanopsis cuspidata but includes small reptiles and invertebrates of many types.

The bird nests in large cavities in trees but otherwise the nest is the same as that of the other two Garrulus species with 3–4 eggs.

The voice is similar to that of the Eurasian jay.

The species was threatened in the past by hunting for its feathers, which were used for decorating ladies' hats. Today it is threatened by introduced small Indian mongooses, which were brought to its range to control the venomous Okinawa pit viper. The species is fully protected under Japanese law and is increasing in numbers thanks to control of the mongooses.

The species name commemorates the Dutch zoologist Theodoor Gerard van Lidth de Jeude.

In 1965 it was chosen as the symbolic bird of Kagoshima Prefecture

References

Lidth's jay
Endemic birds of Japan
Birds of the Ryukyu Islands
Lidth's jay
Natural monuments of Japan
Taxa named by Charles Lucien Bonaparte